Auguste Puton (born Jean Baptiste Auguste Puton 16 August 1834– died 8 April 1913) was a French zoologist, specialising in Heteroptera of the palearctic and in particular France. He published over 150 papers and a few catalogs. He described many new species, most of them are now owned by the National Museum of Natural History (France).

Works
Catalogue des hémiptères hétéroptères d'Europe / par A. Puton, .. / Paris : Deyrolle, 1869 
Catalogue des hémiptères-hétéroptères de L'Alsace et de Lorraine [Texte imprimé] / Ferdinand Reiber, A. Puton / Colmar : Decker C, 1876 
Catalogue des hémiptères-homoptères (cicadines et psyllides) de l'Alsace et de la Lorraine et Supplément au catalogue des hémiptères-hétéroptères / Ferdinand Reiber, A. Puton / Colmar : Decker C, 1880 
Synopsis des Hémiptères-Hétéroptères de France T. I, 3ème partie, Reduvides, Saldides, Hydrocorises / Auguste Puton / Paris : Deyrolle, 1880

References
Randall T. Schuh, James Alexander Slater, True bugs of the world (Hemiptera:Heteroptera): classification and natural history, Cornell University Press, 1995, page 11.

1834 births
1913 deaths
French entomologists
Hemipterists